Van Buren is a town in Van Buren Township, Grant County, Indiana, United States. The population was 864 at the 2010 census.

History
Joseph Boxell platted Van Buren Township in 1837. Martin Van Buren was the United States president at the time. In 1843 George H. D. Rood settled here and the creek that runs through the town was called Roods Run. As the area grew and developed it was called many names including Roods Corner, Roods Town, Roods Crossroads and Stringtown. In 1888 C.W. platted the area and it was known as Van Buren. In June 1892 the town became incorporated by the state of Indiana.

Geography
Van Buren is located at  (40.616856, -85.506393).

Demographics

2010 census
As of the census of 2010, there were 864 people, 357 households, and 241 families living in the town. The racial makeup of the town was 98.0% White, 0.2% Native American, 0.3% Asian, 0.3% from other races, and 1.0% from two or more races. Hispanic or Latino of any race were 0.9% of the population.

There were 357 households, of which 35.0% had children under the age of 18 living with them, 44.0% were married couples living together, 17.4% had a female householder with no husband present, 6.2% had a male householder with no wife present, and 32.5% were non-families. 30.0% of all households were made up of individuals, and 11.5% had someone living alone who was 65 years of age or older. The average household size was 2.42 and the average family size was 2.96.

The median age in the town was 38.6 years. 26.6% of residents were under the age of 18; 7.5% were between the ages of 18 and 24; 25.3% were from 25 to 44; 26.8% were from 45 to 64; and 13.8% were 65 years of age or older. The gender makeup of the town was 47.0% male and 53.0% female.

2000 census
As of the census of 2000, there were 935 people, 371 households, and 264 families living in the town. The racial makeup of the town was 97.33% White, 0.11% African American, 0.21% Native American, 0.21% Asian, 0.86% from other races, and 1.28% from two or more races. Hispanic or Latino of any race were 1.39% of the population.

There were 371 households, out of which 34.8% had children under the age of 18 living with them, 54.2% were married couples living together, 12.7% had a female householder with no husband present, and 28.8% were non-families. 25.3% of all households were made up of individuals, and 13.7% had someone living alone who was 65 years of age or older. The average household size was 2.52 and the average family size was 2.98.

In the town, the population was spread out, with 28.8% under the age of 18, 6.7% from 18 to 24, 27.7% from 25 to 44, 21.4% from 45 to 64, and 15.4% who were 65 years of age or older. The median age was 35 years. For every 100 females, there were 94.0 males. For every 100 females age 18 and over, there were 85.5 males.

The median income for a household in the town was $36,719, and the median income for a family was $43,182. Males had a median income of $36,250 versus $21,111 for females. The per capita income for the town was $14,403. About 8.7% of families and 9.6% of the population were below the poverty line, including 14.6% of those under age 18 and 9.0% of those age 65 or over.

Education
The town has a lending library, the Van Buren Public Library.

Arts and culture

Annual cultural events
Van Buren bills itself as the "Popcorn Capitol of the World." The largest local employer is the Weaver Popcorn Company; accordingly, its most famous annual event is the Popcorn Festival, held each August.

Notable people
 Jared Lee, cartoonist

References

External links
 
 Town of Van Buren, Indiana website
 Van Buren Popcorn Festival

Towns in Grant County, Indiana
Towns in Indiana